Birka was a German passenger ship built in 1937. She was requistioned by the Kriegsmarine during the Second World War for use as a hospital ship. She struck a mine and sank in 1943.

Description
The engine was built by Flensburger Schiffbau-Gesellschaft, Flensburg, Germany. It was rated at 184nhp and drove a single screw propeller.

History
Birka was built by Flensburger Schiffbau-Gesellschaft for Mathies Reederei KG, Hamburg, Germany. She was launched on 23 June 1937. Her port of registry was Hamburrg and the Code Letters DJUF were allocated. On 24 November 1937, She ran aground off the coast of Sweden and was severely damaged. She was refloated the next day and taken in to Stockholm for repairs.

On 5 September 1940, Birka was requistioned by the Kriegsmarine for use as a hospital ship. Allocated to 5 Vorpostengruppe and designated as "Schiff 8", she served in Norwegian waters. On 1 June 1943, she struck a mine and sank in the Altafjord with the loss of 115 lives. The Stockholms-Tidningen claimed that Birka had been used to carry troops and munitions from Trondheim to Kirkenes in violation of her status as a hospital ship.

References

1937 ships
Ships built in Flensburg
Steamships of Germany
Merchant ships of Germany
World War II merchant ships of Germany
Maritime incidents in 1937
Auxiliary ships of the Kriegsmarine
Hospital ships in World War II
Maritime incidents in June 1943
World War II shipwrecks in the North Sea